Cameo or CAMEO may refer to:
 Cameo appearance, a brief appearance of a known figure in a film or television show
 Cameo (carving), a method of carving, making use of layers of different colours, or an item made with such a method

Music 
 Cameo (album), an album by Dusty Springfield
 Cameo (band), an American funk group
 Cameo Records, a 1920s New York-based record label
 DJ Cameo, a British disc jockey and radio presenter
 "Cameo", a song by Devo from Something for Everybody
 "Cameo", a 2015 song by Momus from Turpsycore

Places 
 Cameo, California, a community
 Cameo, Colorado, a ghost town
 Cameo, West Virginia

Other uses 
 Cameo (apple), a cultivar of apple
 Cameo (coinage), a finish evaluated in the process of coin grading
 CAMEO (database), Conservation and Art Materials Encyclopedia Online, a Museum of Fine Arts, Boston database of technical terms used in art conservation and historic preservation
 CAMEO (satellite), an experiment included in the Nimbus-G launch
 Cameo (website), a website allowing users to interact with celebrities via video
 The Cameo, a 1913 French silent film
 The Cameo, Edinburgh, a cinema
 Computer-aided management of emergency operations
 Conflict and Mediation Event Observations
 EyeToy: Cameo, a system used with video games

See also 
 Cameo lighting, a type of spotlight
 Cameo-Parkway Records, a 1950s and 1960s Philadelphia-based record label
 CAMEO3D (Continuous Automated Model EvaluatiOn)
 Kameo, an action-adventure video game